Eliot James is a British record producer, songwriter, musician, audio engineer and mixer, based at Eastcote Studios in West London, England.

Selected production credits include:
Tor Miller  "Midnight" EP
Two Door Cinema Club Tourist History Album
Kaiser Chiefs Off With Their Heads Album. Co-Produced with Mark Ronson,
Noah and the Whale Peaceful, The World Lays Me Down Album
The Coronas The Long Way LP
Coasts (band) Coasts LP (various tracks)
Puggy To Win The World LP
Plan B "Everyday" Single
The Futureheads "Area" Single
"Does It Offend You, Yeah?" You Have No Idea What You're Getting Yourself Into Album
Gabriella Cilmi's The Sting
Bloc Party Silent Alarm (*additional production only : produced by Paul Epworth)
Jamie N Commons The Baron EP
Last Dinosaurs In A Million Years Album (mix only)
Police Dog Hogan From the Land of Miracles Album

He was the recipient of the 2011 MPG Breakthrough Producer of The Year award.

References

Living people
British record producers
British audio engineers
Year of birth missing (living people)